The 38th Filmfare Awards South Ceremony honouring the winners of the best of South Indian cinema in 1990 is an event held on 11 August 1991 was an event held at the Kamaraj Memorial Hall, Madras. The chief guest of the evening was The Governor of Tamil Nadu Mr. Bhishma Narain Singh and Actor Shatrughan Sinha.

Awards

Main awards

Kannada cinema

Malayalam cinema

Tamil cinema

Telugu cinema

Special awards

Awards presentation

 V. B. K. Menon (Best Film Malayalam)  Received Award from Ramki
 K. A. Ashok Pai (Best Film Kannada) Received Award from Vani Ganapathy
 A. M. Rathnam (Best Film Telugu)  Received Award from Nirosha
 R. B. Choudary (Best Film Tamil) Received Award from Balu Mahendra
 Bhadran (Best Director Malayalam) Received Award from Archana
 Suresh Heblikar (Best Director Kannada) Received Award from Gulshan Grover
 Mani Ratnam (Best Director Tamil) Received Award from Shilpa Shirodkar
 Ravindran (Best Music Director Malayalam) Received Award from Jayachitra
 S. A. Rajkumar (Best Music Director Kannada) & (Best Music Director Tamil) Received Award from Srividya
 Shobana (Best Actress Malayalam) Received Award from Shatrughan Sinha
 Suhasini (Best Actress Kannada) Received Award from Venkatesh
 Nirosha Received on behalf of sister Raadhika Award (Best Actress Tamil) from G. Venkateswaran
 Mammootty (Best Actor Malayalam) Received Award from Rekha
 Rajasekhar (Best Actor Telugu) Received Award from Romu Sippy
 Karthik (Best Actor Tamil) Received Award from Poonam Sinha
 M. T. Vasudevan Nair (Special Award) Received Award from Bhishma Narain Singh

References

External links
 
 

Filmfare Awards South